Walter Rahm (born 17 April 1954) is a Swiss bobsledder. He competed in the two man and the four man events at the 1980 Winter Olympics.

References

1954 births
Living people
Swiss male bobsledders
Olympic bobsledders of Switzerland
Bobsledders at the 1980 Winter Olympics
Place of birth missing (living people)